Unweave the Weave was a $120-million road construction project that reconstructed the interchanges of Interstate 694 and Interstate 35E in Little Canada and Vadnais Heights, Minnesota.  The project sought to eliminate unnecessary lane changes by having all entrances and exits to the highway occur on the same side of the road.  The project began in mid 2004 and ended in late 2008.

Project overview

This project was designed around several factors, a few of which included increasing freeway traffic capacity, increasing driver safety, and eliminating weaving and lane changes (eliminating "geometric deficiencies"), hence the name of the project, "Unweave the Weave". This weaving was the case for most drivers prior to 2005, before most of the road reconstruction work on the interchanges was done. As a result of lane changing and constant congestion, many accidents occurred on the interchange after its completion in the early 1970s. The current layout of the two Interstates now provides for safer exits and entrances, minimal congestion, and better road surface durability. A similar project, the I-35W/US 10/I-694 North Central Corridor Reconstruction Project, aims to achieve these similar goals. The North Central project's area lies directly west of the boundaries of the 'Unweave' project denoted here.

The construction area is roughly a 3-mile region of both Interstates 694 and 35E in the northeastern portion of the Twin Cities. The work on Interstate 35E ranges from Minnesota State Highway 36 (exits 111A and B) on the south to Ramsey County Road E (CSAH 15, exit 115) on the north. The work on Interstate 694 ranges from Rice Street (CSAH 49, exit 45) on the west to U.S. Highway 61 (exit 48) on the east. Communities involved in this project include Little Canada and Vadnais Heights, as well as the neighboring communities of Shoreview, Maplewood and White Bear Lake.

The project also realigned the two interstates to improve the infrastructure of the highway from an asphalt surface to a complete concrete surface. Numerous bridges were rebuilt, including the residential streets of Edgerton Street and Labore Road in Vadnais Heights.

Construction breakdown

The Unweave the Weave project was split into many phases of work, spanned out over the course of several construction seasons, starting from the summer of 2004. This section splits the activities during construction into each year of work.

2004

In 2004, the Edgerton Street bridge over the Interstate 694 commons area was demolished and rebuilt. This rebuild would accommodate for the expansion of the commons area for the work to take place in 2005, 2006, and 2007. Also in 2004, design work for the west and east interchanges was completed with the intent to eliminate weaving issues, as well as add additional lanes inside the commons area in between the two junctions.

2005

The following year, bridge abutments were put into place for new replacement bridges for the project. Final work on the Edgerton Street bridge was completed, for a total cost of $3 million. Cranes began coming onto the project to haul steel material into staging areas for bridge replacement. Also, late in 2005, bridge piers were installed and put into place for bridge construction on the west end of the project. This set of piers were put into place on a flyover bridge from NB Interstate 35E to WB Interstate 694. As of December 2005, all original bridges still existed throughout the project. No work on lane widening or interstate reconstruction was in progress at the time.

2006

2006 brought a beginning to the rebuilding of Interstates 35E and 694. Beginning in May 2006, bypasses and detours of interstate traffic were set up along both interstates, first covering the total distance of the project on both interstates, and a retaining wall along NB 35E was also started from Little Canada Road to the west junction of Interstates 35E and 694. Construction of two bridges on both the east end of the project and the west end of the project continued through June 2006, and noise walls were beginning to be installed along SB Interstate 35E to the east end of the commons section. This continued into August, and flyover bridge construction continued going from NB Interstate 35E to WB Interstate 694 on the west end of the project. Noise wall construction in two areas of the project were completed by the early part of September, and permanent pavement was beginning to be poured from Ramsey County Road E to Interstate 694 on the east end of the project, and from Little Canada Road to Interstate 694 on the west end of the project.

In October 2006, bridge abutments were formed on the flyover bridge, and piers were still being constructed for the opposite end of the flyover bridge where it met with WB Interstate 694. All original bridges still existed through this month. During the middle of October, more bypasses were paved along the west end of the project, especially in the area along WB Interstate 694 from the west end of the commons to Rice Street. Roadway grading and construction of permanent pavement along EB Interstate 694 from the east junction of Interstates 694 and 35E to U.S. Highway 61 began in the middle part of October. Abutments of the two bridges carrying WB Interstate 694 traffic into the commons area was completed, and steel beams were erected and placed along the bridges.

Bridge construction continued through November 2006, and one bypass of a bridge spanning from NB Interstate 35E to WB Interstate 694 prevented access to the Rice Street exit. This would be remedied through the construction of the Edgerton Street bypass that would be set up for use in 2007. The 2006 construction season came to a close with the completion of the NB Interstate 35E to WB Interstate 694 flyover bridge that carries U.S. Highway 10 traffic.

2007

Construction continued on bridges throughout the project in January and February 2007. In addition to bridge construction, the Department of Transportation installed new cameras along the project to allow users to view the progress of the project over the Internet. Bridge construction from the previous year was completed in March, and traffic changes were made to accommodate the construction of the new bridges. From this point on, the original bridges along Interstate 694 were beginning to be demolished for the replacement bridges to take their places. On the morning of April 2, the Labore Road bridge spanning Interstate 694 was closed to traffic. This bridge was demolished during the weekend of April 20–23, 2007. After the Labore Road bridge was demolished, a section of permanent pavement on NB Interstate 35E was completed from Interstate 694 to Ramsey County Road E. This required a temporary closure of the ramp from NB Interstate 35E to Ramsey County Road E, but was reopened in early June. Also taking place in June was the demolition of the bridge carrying WB Interstate 694 traffic towards SB Interstate 35E in the west end of the commons section. This was removed on the weekend of June 8–10.

Bridge demolition continued on two bridges within the commons section. One included the demolition of the original bridge carrying traffic from SB Interstate 35E to EB Interstate 694. The other was the bridge carrying WB Interstate 694 traffic into the commons section. These events occurred over the weekend of June 22, 2007. Bridge demolition was completed by the early part of July. Work on medians and lanes on SB Interstate 35E in the vicinity of Little Canada Road forced a separation of traffic lanes on SB Interstate 35E. Traffic coming from the west end of the Interstate 694 commons section did not have access to Little Canada Road. Work on these medians was completed in the early winter of 2007.

By the beginning of August 2007, the Unweave the Weave project started to look complete. Most of the permanent pavement was poured by the end of summer, and all of the replacement bridges (except for the Labore Road bridge) were completed. The bridge spanning Interstate 694 from SB Interstate 35E to EB Interstate 694 was opened at the very end of July, and the bridges over WB Interstate 694 carrying traffic into the commons area were complete and being used. The replacement flyover bridge from NB Interstate 35E to WB Interstate 694 was opened the week of August 1, 2007. At this point, the Edgerton Street bypass was closed to traffic since the flyover bridge was complete. The bypass was originally designed to carry traffic from NB Interstate 35E to WB Interstate 694 while the flyover bridge was closed. This bypass used one side of the Edgerton Street bridge, and there was no access to Edgerton Street from this bypass. The bypass also allowed for access to Rice Street from WB Interstate 694 for those who used Rice Street.

2008

April 2008 marked the last construction season on the project. Work resumed for the 2008 construction season the week of April 17, 2008. Some of the work that had been completed in 2008 included the reopening of the Labore Road bridge and its approaches, Interstate 694 WB leaving the west end of the commons section, EB Interstate 694 at U.S. Highway 61, as well as landscaping and noisewall painting. Also, construction of stormwater drainage ponds and median barriers were completed. Final cleanup for the project wrapped up in the latter part of 2008.

On May 12, MN/DOT closed the ramp from EB Interstate 694 to U.S. Highway 61 for construction of a new ramp to the thoroughfare.
The ramp was completed and reopened in early July. Permanent concrete pavement was put down on EB Interstate 694 between Interstate 35E and U.S. Highway 61 the week of July 7. During early August, MnDOT finished pouring of permanent pavement at the east end of the commons, preventing traffic from entering NB Interstate 35E from EB Interstate 694. This task was completed in the late part of the month. The Labore Road bridge was also reopened to traffic on August 27.

MnDOT held an official project completion celebration during the afternoon of October 23, 2008. This was the invitation to attend the completion ceremony: According to the White Bear Press, state and local employees unknotted a rope instead of cutting a ribbon to mark the project complete.

Interstate freeway designs

This section depicts the overall change in freeway design between pre-construction in 2004 and construction completion in 2008. The maps do not have a set scale; it simply depicts overall freeway design. For reference, the distance between the west and east interchanges of Interstate 35E is approximately 1 mile.

Table of freeway changes: pre-construction to post-construction

The following table lists changes the Minnesota Department of Transportation made to the system of interchanges as a whole between 2004 and 2008.

Footnotes

Urban design
Interstate Highways in Minnesota
Interstate 35